Events from the year 1973 in France.

Incumbents
 President: Georges Pompidou 
 Prime Minister: Pierre Messmer

Events
4 March – Legislative Election held.
11 March – Legislative Election held.
3 June – A Tupolev Tu-144 supersonic aircraft crashes at the Paris air show; 14 are killed.
11 July – Varig Flight 820 Boeing 707 crashes near Orly Airport, Paris, resulting in 123 deaths, with 11 survivors.
20 July – France resumes nuclear bomb tests in Mururoa Atoll, over the protests of Australia and New Zealand.
23 September – Cantonales Elections held.
30 September – Cantonales Elections held.

Births

January to March
11 January – Christophe Medaillon, soccer player
12 January – Olivier Peslier, jockey
15 January – Aurelie Dupont, ballet dancer
19 January – Karen Lancaume, adult film star (died 2005)
26 January – Melvil Poupaud, actor
29 January – Fabien Foret, motorcycle racer
30 January – Olivier Marceau, triathlete
6 February – Élisabeth Grousselle, athlete
12 February – Thomas Dufour, curler
18 February – Claude Makélélé, international soccer player
22 February – Philippe Gaumont, cyclist
24 February – Antony Dupuis, tennis player
25 February
Hélène de Fougerolles, actress
Gérald Merceron, international rugby union player
28 February – Philippe Brunel, soccer player
3 March – Charles-Philippe, Duke of Anjou
13 March – Olivier Asmaker, cyclist
26 March – Sébastien Charpentier, motorcycle road racer

April to June
4 April – Samassi Abou, soccer player
5 April
Élodie Bouchez, actress
Vanessa Demouy, actress and model
Yacine Douma, judoka
6 April – Franck Marchis, astronomer and planetary scientist
7 April – Carole Montillet, alpine skier
10 April – Guillaume Canet, actor and film director
11 April – Olivier Magne, international rugby union player
12 April
Joël Lautier, chess grandmaster
Lionel Roux, tennis player
13 April – Nicolas Jalabert, cyclist
16 April – Jérôme Bonnissel, soccer player
19 April
David Chaussinand, hammer thrower
Patrice Estanguet, slalom canoer and Olympic medallist
26 April – Jules Naudet, filmmaker
8 May – Laurent Charvet, soccer player
13 May – Franck Dumoulin, pistol shooter and Olympic gold medallist
15 May – Pascal Gentil, taekwondo practitioner and Olympic medallist
17 May – Frédéric Havas, volleyball player
20 May – Christophe Laussucq, rugby union player
22 May – Yannick Bru, rugby union player
24 May – Eric Carrière, soccer player
12 June – Olivier Baudry, soccer player
14 June – Stéphanie Arricau, golfer
17 June – Louis Leterrier, film director
18 June – Julie Depardieu, actress
22 June – Cyril Saugrain, cyclist
27 June – Frédéric Roux, soccer player

July to September
19 July – Saïd Taghmaoui, actor and screenwriter
31 July – Alexandre Bonnot, soccer player
4 August – Xavier Marchand, swimmer
5 August – Laurent Redon, motor racing driver
7 August – Florent Laville, soccer player
18 August – Jerome Lagarrigue, painter and illustrator
25 August – Bernard Inom, boxer
26 August – Laurent Huard, soccer coach
29 August – Olivier Jacque, motorcycle road racer
30 August – Sophie Dodemont, archer and Olympic medallist
9 September – Jérôme Golmard, tennis player
18 September – Laurent Foirest, basketball player
19 September
Frédéric Kakon, guitarist
Stéphane Porato, soccer player
25 September – Jean-Yves de Blasiis, soccer player
27 September – Arnaud Lebrun, soccer player
30 September – Sébastien Dallet, soccer player

October to December
6 October – Cyrille Diabate, mixed martial artist
10 October – Joël Chenal, alpine skier
13 October – Guillaume Florent, sailor and Olympic medallist
15 October – Jean-Louis Valois, soccer player
24 October
Vincent Candela, international soccer player
Yannick Quesnel, soccer player
29 October – Robert Pires, international soccer player
3 November – Patrick Moreau, soccer player
8 November – Frédéric Brando, soccer player
12 November – Stéphane Glas, rugby union player
13 November – David Auradou, rugby union player
16 November – Mathieu Bozzetto, snowboarder
23 November
Marie Collonvillé, heptathlete
Grégory Malicki, soccer player
24 November – Sébastien Pérez, soccer player
7 December – Fabien Pelous, international rugby union player
14 December – Jean-Paul Mendy, boxer
15 December – Surya Bonaly, figure skater
24 December – Frédéric Demontfaucon, judoka
29 December – Christophe Rinero, cyclist

Full date unknown
Chloé Delaume, novelist, performer and musician
Gaël Duval, software designer
David Grimal, violinist

Deaths

January to June
15 February – Achille Liénart, cardinal (born 1884)
1 March – Henri Meslot, athlete (born 1884)
2 March – Jules Ladoumègue, athlete and Olympic medallist (born 1906)
18 March – Roland Dorgelès, novelist (born 1885)
30 March – Yves Giraud-Cabantous, motor racing driver (born 1904)
2 April – Joseph-Charles Lefèbvre, cardinal (born 1892)
25 April – Armand Léon Annet, colonial governor (born 1888)
28 April – Jacques Maritain, Catholic philosopher (born 1882)
18 May – Dieudonne Costes, aviator (born 1892)
3 June – Jean Batmale, soccer player (born 1895)
4 June – Maurice René Fréchet, mathematician (born 1878)
18 June – Georges Bonnet, politician (born 1889)

July to December
29 July – Henri Charrière, convicted felon and author (born 1906)
2 August – Jean-Pierre Melville, filmmaker (born 1917)
17 August – Jean Barraqué, composer (born 1928)
18 August – François Bonlieu, Alpine skier and Olympic gold medallist (born 1937)
30 August – Robert Défossé, soccer player (born 1909)
14 September – Roger Bourdin, baritone (born 1900)
6 October – François Cevert, motor racing driver (born 1944)
8 October – Gabriel Marcel, philosopher (born 1889)
23 October – Maurice Princet, mathematician and actuary (born 1875)
6 November – Noël Roquevert, actor (born 1892)
1 December – Albert Dupouy, rugby union player (born 1901)
25 December – Gabriel Voisin, aviation pioneer (born 1880)
30 December 
 Marcel-Bruno Gensoul, admiral (born 1880)
 Henri Büsser, composer and conductor (born 1872)

References

Links

1970s in France